The South African cricket team toured Sri Lanka from 20 July to 6 August 2013. The tour consisted of five One Day International and three Twenty20 International matches. Sri Lankan ODI captain Angelo Mathews was suspended for the first two ODI matches due to maintaining a slow over-rate during the final match of the West Indies tri-nation series. The other members of the Sri Lanka team were fined 40% of their match fees. Dinesh Chandimal served as captain in Mathews' stead making him, at 23, the youngest ODI captain in the history of Sri Lankan cricket.

Squads

Tour Matches

Sri Lanka Cricket Board President's XI v South Africans

ODI Series

1st ODI

2nd ODI

3rd ODI

4th ODI

5th ODI

T20I Series

1st T20I

2nd T20I

3rd T20I

Broadcasting Rights

References

2013 in South African cricket
2013 in Sri Lankan cricket
2013
International cricket competitions in 2013
Sri Lankan cricket seasons from 2000–01